Intoxicated Women is a studio album by Australian musician Mick Harvey. It was released in January 2017 under Mute Records. It was volume 4 of Harvey's Serge Gainsbourg interpretations/translations.

Track listing

Personnel
Mick Harvey - vocals, guitar, piano, organ, drums, bongos, cabasa
Andrea Schroeder - vocals on "Ich Liebe Dich...Ich Dich Auch Nicht", "God Smokes Havanas" and "Striptease"
Srey Kak Chanthy - vocals on "Contact"
Xanthe Waite - vocals on "Contact" and "Puppet of Wax, Puppet of Song", backing vocals on "Baby Teeth, Wolfy Teeth"
Jessica Ribeiro - vocals on "Prévert's Song" and "The Drowned One"
Sophia Brous - vocals on "The Eyes to Cry" and "While Rereading Your Letter"
Solomon Harvey - vocals on "Baby Teeth, Wolfy Teeth"
Julitha Ryan, Mick Harvey, Xanthe Waite - choir on "Cargo Cult"
Lyndelle-Jayne Spruyt - vocals on "Sensuelle et Sans Suite"
J.P. Shilo - guitar, slide guitar, vocals
Bertrand Burgalat, Glenn Lewis - bass
Toby Dammit, Hugo Cran - drums
Steve Shelley - hi-hat, tambourine
Yoyo Röhm - organ, piano, e-bow
Brenton Conlan - trumpet on "Baby Teeth, Wolfy Teeth"
Anouk Ross, Biddy Connor, Bronwyn Henderson, Dahlia Adamopoulos, Lizzy Walsh, Pauline Hauswirth, Vincent Catulescu - strings 
Technical
Brenton Conlan, David Mestre, Ingo Krauss - engineer
Lindsay Gravina - mixing

Charts

References

2017 albums
Mick Harvey albums
Mute Records albums
Serge Gainsbourg tribute albums